The Big Dig was a highway-construction project in Boston.

Big Dig may also refer to:

 Big Dig (Regina, Saskatchewan)
 Big Dig (Liverpool)
 The Big Dig (film), a 1969 Israeli comedy film
 The Big Dig (TV series), a television series about allotments in the UK
 The Big Dig also refers to the Wawa Drop-In Project or Big Dig held at Wawa, Ontario in 1971
 The Big Dig Archaeological Site, an archaeology site in Sydney, New South Wales, Australia

Other uses
 The Erie Canal, while it was being constructed; also sometimes called "Clinton's Big Dig", after Governor DeWitt Clinton